The 1938 Pittsburgh Pirates season was their sixth as a professional football club in the National Football League (NFL). The '38 Pirates welcomed back John McNally as head coach after finishing with a 4-10 record the previous year. McNally coached the team's second 2-win season in 3 years, as they placed last in the NFL Eastern Division.

The '38 team welcomed one of the Steelers' best players during their tenure as "the Pirates" (1933-1940). Art Rooney signed college phenom Byron "Whizzer" White for one season and was given a huge contract. White led the league in rushing that year, and became the first player to do so whilst playing for a losing team. He left the team the next year to pursue his studies overseas, he did however return as a Lion in 1940.

Preseason
September 3, 1938: at St. Rosalia Preps of Wilkinsburg, Pennsylvania: win 54–0
September 4, 1938: at Modern Athletic Club of Jeannette, Pennsylvania: win 46–0

1938 NFL Draft

The Pirates selected one of their best draft picks of that era in Byron "Whizzer" White from Colorado. He was given a large $15,000 contract to play in 1938. White finished the season with 152 rushes for 567 yards, 4 TD, and 7 catches for 88 yards. After the season, he continued his studies overseas. He did return and play for the Detroit Lions in 1940 and 1941.

Regular season

Schedule

Game Summaries

Week 1 (Friday September 9, 1938): Detroit Lions 

at Titan Stadium, Detroit, Michigan

 Game time: 
 Game weather: 
 Game attendance: 17,000
 Referee:

Scoring Drives:

 Detroit – FG Shepherd 27
 Detroit – Caddel 5 run (kick failed)
 Detroit – Cardwell 5 run (Moscrip kick)
 Pittsburgh – White 3 run (Niccolai kick)

Week 2 (Sunday, September 11, 1938): New York Giants  

at Forbes Field, Pittsburgh, Pennsylvania

 Game time: 
 Game weather: 
 Game attendance: 17,340
 Referee:

Scoring Drives:

 Pittsburgh – White 4 run (Niccolai kick)
 New York – Leemans 1 run (kick blocked)
 Pittsburgh – Manske 23 pass from Filchock (Niccolai kick)
 New York – Shaffer 3 pass from Danowski (Soar kick)
 New York – Shaffer 11 pass from Danowski (Cuff kick)
 New York – Soar 1 run (Soar kick)

Week 3 (Friday September 16, 1938): Philadelphia Eagles  

at Civic Stadium, Buffalo, New York

 Game time: 
 Game weather: 
 Game attendance: 19,749
 Referee:

Scoring Drives:

 Philadelphia – Arnold 20 fumble run (Smukler kick)
 Philadelphia – Arnold 34 pass from Riffle (Reese kick)
 Philadelphia – Arnold 23 interception (kick failed)
 Philadelphia – Riffle 44 run (Smukler kick)
 Pittsburgh – White 1 run (Niccolai kick)

Week 4 (Friday September 23, 1938): Brooklyn Dodgers  

at Ebbets Field, Brooklyn, New York

 Game time: 
 Game weather: 
 Game attendance: 21,494
 Referee:

Scoring Drives:

 Brooklyn – FG Reissig 18
 Pittsburgh – Manske 27 fumble run (Niccolai kick)
 Pittsburgh – Thompson 5 run (Niccolai kick)
 Pittsburgh – FG Niccolai 18

Week 5 (Monday October 3, 1938): New York Giants  
Prior to this game, the Pirates played an exhibition against the Boston Shamrocks, winning 16–6.

at Polo Grounds, New York, NY

 Game time: 
 Game weather: 
 Game attendance: 18,805
 Referee:

Scoring Drives:

 New York – Cuff 18 pass from Danowski (Cuff kick)
 Pittsburgh – Sortet 24 pass from Filchock (Niccolai kick)
 New York – FG Cuff 10
 Pittsburgh – Sortet 13 pass from Filchock (kick failed)

Week 6 (Sunday October 9, 1938): Brooklyn Dodgers  

at Forbes Field, Pittsburgh, Pennsylvania

 Game time: 
 Game weather: 
 Game attendance:
 Referee:

Scoring Drives:

 Brooklyn – FG Kercheval 34
 Pittsburgh – Sortet 50 pass from White (Niccolai kick)
 Brooklyn – Barreturnt 54 pass from Parker (Kercheval kick)
 Brooklyn – Parker 77 run (Parker kick)

Week 7 (Sunday October 23, 1938): Green Bay Packers  

at Forbes Field, Pittsburgh, Pennsylvania

 Game time: 
 Game weather: 
 Game attendance: 12,142
 Referee:

Scoring Drives:

 Green Bay – Isbell 38 run (Hinkle kick)
 Green Bay – Laws 38 interception (kick failed)
 Green Bay – Mullenaux 19 pass from Monnett (Monnett kick)

Week 8: Bye week 
During their bye week, the Pirates scheduled two exhibition games, both wins against the Warren Redjackets (23–0 on Sunday, October 30) and McKeesport Olympics (21–6 on Monday, October 31).

Week 9 (Sunday November 6, 1938): Washington Redskins  

at Forbes Field, Pittsburgh, Pennsylvania

 Game time: 
 Game weather: 
 Game attendance: 12,910
 Referee:

Scoring Drives:

 Washington – Karamatic 39 pass from Baugh (Manton kick)

Week 10: Bye week 
During a second bye week, the Pirates scheduled a two-legged tie against the Los Angeles Bulldogs. The first game, an Armistice Day special, was held at Will Rogers Memorial Stadium in Colorado Springs, Colorado (in Pirates star Byron White's home state) on November 11. The Pirates lost that game, 17–6, in front of a crowd of 15,000 fans. The second leg of the series was held at the Bulldogs' home field, Gilmore Stadium, at which the Pirates and Bulldogs played to a 14–14 draw in front of 18,000 fans.

Week 11 (Sunday November 20, 1938): Philadelphia Eagles  

at Laidley Field, Charleston, West Virginia

 Game time: 
 Game weather: 
 Game attendance: 6,500
 Referee:

Scoring Drives:

 Philadelphia – Hewitt pass from Smukler (Smukler kick)
 Pittsburgh – White 79 run (Niccolai kick)
 Philadelphia – Carter 11 pas from Smukler (Reese kick)

Week 12 (Sunday November 27, 1938): Washington Redskins  

at Griffith Stadium, Washington, DC

 Game time: 
 Game weather: 
 Game attendance: 22,000
 Referee:

Scoring Drives:

 Washington – FG Manton 23
 Washington – Millner pass from Baugh
 Washington – McChesney 52 pass from Baugh (kick failed)

Week 13 (Tuesday December 4, 1938): Cleveland Rams  

at Tulane Stadium, New Orleans, Louisiana

 Game time: 
 Game weather: 
 Game attendance: 7,500
 Referee:

Scoring Drives:

 Cleveland – Benton 28 pass from Snyder (Snyder kick)
 Cleveland – Benton 11 pass from Snyder (kick failed)
 Pittsburgh – Sortet 8 pass from White (Niccolai kick)

Standings

References
Hogrogian, John (1996). “Byron White's Rookie Season.” Professional Football Researchers Association. Retrieved September 24, 2014.

Pittsburgh Steelers seasons
Pittsburgh Pirates
Pittsburg Pir